David Canal Valero (born 7 December 1978 in Barcelona, Catalonia) is a former Spanish sprinter who specialized in the 400 metres.

Achievements

Personal bests
100 metres - 10.53 s (2002)
200 metres - 20.68 s (2004)
400 metres - 45.01 s (2003)

References

External links
Sporting-Heroes.net

1978 births
Living people
Spanish male sprinters
Athletes from Catalonia
Athletes (track and field) at the 2000 Summer Olympics
Athletes (track and field) at the 2004 Summer Olympics
Olympic athletes of Spain
Athletes from Barcelona
European Athletics Championships medalists
Mediterranean Games gold medalists for Spain
Mediterranean Games medalists in athletics
Athletes (track and field) at the 2005 Mediterranean Games
20th-century Spanish people
21st-century Spanish people